The Band of the Royal Regiment of Scotland is one of the three official military bands of the Royal Regiment of Scotland, and is based at Dreghorn Barracks, Edinburgh. The bandsmen wear the feather bonnet with a red over white hackle and scarlet doublet in full dress uniform. In addition, there are two Territorial bands, the Highland Band and the Lowland Band, which are administered by the regiment's territorial battalions. It is also one of two line infantry bands in the Royal Corps of Army Music.

Ensembles 
 Concert band
 Marching band
 Dance band
 Pipes and Drums
 Fanfare Trumpeters
 Jazz Ensemble

Other musical activities
The SCOTS Band performs for events sponsored by the military. Besides military events, it also takes in many charity events in Scotland. Their schedule includes but is not limited to:

 Poppy Scotland
 Remembrance Day
 Beating the Retreat
 Musically supporting schools in both Scotland and the North of England

Gallery

See also
 Royal Corps of Army Music

References

External links
 Corps of Army Music website

British ceremonial units
Royal Corps of Army Music
Musical groups established in 1958
Royal Regiment of Scotland
Scottish ceremonial units
1958 establishments in Scotland